PEX is cross-linked polyethylene, a form of polyethylene with cross-links.

PEX or Pex may also refer to:

Science and technology
Peer exchange, a method to gather peers for BitTorrent
PHIGS Extension to X, in programming
Pex (software), a unit testing framework for the .NET programming languages
Physical examination, in medicine
Plasma exchange, a form of plasmapheresis
Pseudoexfoliation syndrome, condition related to glaucoma
Parasitic extraction, tool in IC Layout Design, used for extract parasitic elements and see their effects on the circuit

Other
Palestine Exchange, a stock exchange
People Express Airlines (1980s)
PEX, operators of OPEX stock exchange
Pex, a character in the Doctor Who story Paradise Towers

See also
 PXE (disambiguation)